Carol's Second Act is an American television sitcom created by Emily Halpern and Sarah Haskins, which premiered on September 26, 2019 on CBS. It stars Patricia Heaton along with Ito Aghayere, Lucas Neff, Jean-Luc Bilodeau, Sabrina Jalees, Ashley Tisdale, Kyle MacLachlan, and Cedric Yarbrough in supporting roles. In May 2020, the series was canceled after one season.

Premise
After raising her two children and retiring from teaching, Carol Kenney embarks on a unique second act: pursuing her dream of becoming a doctor by completing medical school and beginning an internship at the Loyola Memorial Hospital.

Cast

Main
 Patricia Heaton as Dr. Carol Kenney, the oldest member of the newest group of interns at Loyola Memorial Hospital. Carol is divorced and has two adult children. Before medical school, she used to be a high school science teacher. In the episode "Peer Evaluations", she states that she is in her early 50s. 
 Ito Aghayere as Dr. Maya Jacobs, chief resident at Loyola Memorial with a reputation as a strict disciplinarian and perfectionist. She is in charge of Carol's intern group.
 Lucas Neff as Dr. Caleb Sommers, one of the members of Carol's group of interns who secretly feels he doesn't deserve his position due to having gotten in through family connections. He has a complicated relationship with his superior, Dr. Stephen Frost. 
 Jean-Luc Bilodeau as Dr. Daniel Kutcher, another member of Carol's group of interns. He graduated from Harvard in 2014 and from Duke University School of Medicine in 2018 and has already been published in The New England Journal of Medicine—twice. Nevertheless, he is insecure and overly idealistic about his profession, seeking glory for himself often at the expense of his fellow interns.
 Sabrina Jalees as Dr. Lexie Gilani, another member of Carol's group of interns who is under immense pressure due to having been the first in her family to attend college. She has no patience for doctors who fail to take their jobs seriously.
 Ashley Tisdale as Jenny Kenney, Carol's big-hearted daughter who works as a pharmaceutical representative. Jenny loves and is supportive of Carol, and her practical and outgoing demeanor is a buoyant counterpoint to her mother's neurotic medical colleagues. Despite Carol having told him that Jenny is off-limits, Daniel has a crush on her.
 Kyle MacLachlan as Dr. Stephen Frost, senior attending physician and department chair at Loyola Memorial. He takes an immediate shine to Carol, in contrast to the more merciless Dr. Jacobs.
Cedric Yarbrough as Nurse Dennis, the hospital's merciless nursing supervisor who insists on giving and receiving respect.

Recurring
 Adam Rose as Jake, a nerdy doctor who most of the staff ignores. Also obsessed with Lexie.
 Patrick Fabian as Dr. Victor Lewis, a transplant surgeon and Carol's love interest.

Guest
Camille Chen as Sharon, a patient's wife.
Carol Mansell as Mrs. Zahn, an elderly patient with a fever.
Matt Braunger as Gary, a patient with a fascinating and rare problem.
 Larry VanBuren Jr. as Darrin Alexander, a celebrated college athlete
 Ben Kolyke as Coach Dean, Darrin's coach.
 Essence Atkins as Kathleen, Darrin's mother.
 Jane Kaczmarek as Phyllis, Carol's friend from her teaching days.
 Alan Blumenfeld as Mr. Tuverson, an unpleasant and perverted patient of Carol's
 John Ross Bowie as Gordon, a patient who pretends to be sick to avoid his visiting in-laws
 Kerri Kenney as Nancy
 Marisa Davila as Harper
 Punam Patel as Dr. Mehta
 Scott Lawrence as Dr. Darnton
 Kausar Mohammed as Aisha
 Larry Joe Campbell as Eddie, a patient who is on the waiting list for a liver transplant
 Kelsey Grammer as Dr. Richard Kenney, Carol's ex-husband and Jenny's father

Episodes

Production

Development 
On January 28, 2019, it was announced that CBS had given the production a pilot order. The pilot was written by Emily Halpern and Sarah Haskins, who also executive produce (along with Heaton, Aaron Kaplan and David Hunt). Production companies involved with the pilot include FourBoys Entertainment, Kapital Entertainment and CBS Television Studios. On February 12, 2019, it was announced that Pamela Fryman would direct the pilot.

On May 6, 2019, it was announced that the production had been given a series order. The next day, it was announced that the series would premiere that fall, and air Thursday nights during the 2019–2020 television season.

The series debuted on September 26, 2019. On October 22, 2019, it received a back order of five episodes. On May 6, 2020, CBS canceled the series after one season.

Casting 
In March 2019, it was announced that Bonnie Dennison, Ito Aghayere, Kyle MacLachlan and Jean-Luc Bilodeau had been cast in the pilot's lead roles. On June 7, 2019, it was announced that Ashley Tisdale had replaced Dennison in the role of Jenny. On November 5, 2019, Cedric Yarbrough was promoted to series regular.

Sexual harassment allegations
In October 2019, two female writers alleged sexual harassment by executive producer David Hunt. After their internal complaints to CBS, they said, the writers' access to the set and the showrunners, including Hunt, was limited. Believing this to be retaliation for their complaints, they left the show. Hunt was required to watch a training video although he denied any inappropriate contact with either woman; the producers also say the restrictions on the writers had been planned before they were aware of the women's complaints.

Release

Marketing
On May 15, 2019, CBS released the first official trailer for the series.

Reception

Critical response
The review aggregator website Rotten Tomatoes reported a 58% approval rating with an average rating of 5.63/10, based on 12 reviews. The website's critical consensus reads, "While Carol's Second Act earns high marks for bringing Patricia Heaton front and center, awkward plotting and lackluster jokes hold it back from living up to its star's high standards." Metacritic, which uses a weighted average, assigned a score of 61 out of 100 based on 10 critics, indicating "generally favorable reviews".

Ratings

Home media 
The complete series of Carol's Second Act was released on DVD on November 17, 2020, via Amazon.

References

External links

2010s American medical television series
2010s American sitcoms
2010s American workplace comedy television series
2019 American television series debuts
2020 American television series endings
2020s American medical television series
2020s American sitcoms
2020s American workplace comedy television series
CBS original programming
English-language television shows
Television series by CBS Studios
Television series by Kapital Entertainment